Hamilton Steelhawks may refer to:

 Hamilton Steelhawks (junior), a junior ice hockey team that played in Hamilton, Ontario, from 1984 to 1988
 Hamilton Steelhawks (senior), a senior-level ice hockey team that began play in Hamilton, Ontario, in 2015